A cyclotron is a type of particle accelerator.

Cyclotron may also refer to:

 Cyclotron (album), a 1993 album by Blind Idiot God
 Cyclotron (character), two DC Comics characters
 The Cyclotron, a 2016 Canadian film
 Cyclotron, an unused 1997 Gladiators UK event
Cyclotron (genus) an extinct arthropod belonging to Phosphatocopina

See also
 List of accelerators in particle physics
 :Category:Particle accelerators